Thomas Alured (1583 – May 1638) was an English landowner and politician who sat in the House of Commons from 1628 to 1629.

Alured was the son of John Aldred  of Charterhouse, Hull. He was admitted as a scholar at Trinity College, Cambridge, at Easter 1602. He was admitted at Gray's Inn on 7 May 1604. From about 1606 he was private secretary to Ralph Eure, 3rd Baron Eure, and was given a number of further posts.

Alured initially held property at Ludlow, Shropshire and at  Bewdley, Worcestershire but was later of Blackfriars, London and Edmonton, Middlesex.  In 1628, he was elected Member of Parliament for Hedon and sat until 1629 when King Charles decided to rule without parliament for eleven years.
  
Alured died at the age of about 54 and was buried at St Anne's, Blackfriars.

References

1583 births
1638 deaths
English MPs 1628–1629
17th-century English landowners
Alumni of Trinity College, Cambridge
Members of Gray's Inn
Members of the Parliament of England for Hedon